Ottmar Schreiner (21 February 1946 – 6 April 2013) was a German lawyer and left-wing politician. He was known as one of the leading leftists in his party, SPD.

Education and career
Schreiner studied law at the University of Saarbrücken, the Free University of Berlin and the University of Lausanne. After his Abitur he was a temporary-career soldier; he served as paratrooper officer. After his active career he became a reserve officer. He did reserve officer training in the German Airborne troops (Fallschirmjäger) until his fifties.

In 1969, he became a member of the SPD.

Later he was elected to the Jusos' national leadership. In the election for federal Juso chairmanship in 1977, he was defeated by Klaus Uwe Benneter, who was later suspended from the SPD, and in 1978 he lost to Gerhard Schröder.

From 1980 until his death in April 2013, Schreiner was a member of the Bundestag. He received a direct mandate in the electoral district Saarlouis, which he defended at the federal elections in 2005.

From 1997 to 1998 he was deputy chairman of his party's group in the Bundestag. Schreiner was a member of the metalworkers' union IG Metall.

Death
Schreiner died in April 2013 after a long battle with cancer.

References

External links
 Official website (German)

1946 births
2013 deaths
People from Merzig-Wadern
Members of the Bundestag for Saarland
Jurists from Saarland
Free University of Berlin alumni
University of Lausanne alumni
Members of the Bundestag 2009–2013
Members of the Bundestag 2005–2009
Members of the Bundestag 2002–2005
Members of the Bundestag 1998–2002
Members of the Bundestag 1994–1998
Members of the Bundestag for the Social Democratic Party of Germany